Bian Jing is a Chinese wheelchair fencer. She won the gold medal in the women's sabre A event at the 2020 Summer Paralympics held in Tokyo, Japan. She also won the gold medal in the women's team épèe.

References

External links 
 

Living people
Year of birth missing (living people)
Place of birth missing (living people)
Chinese female fencers
Chinese épée fencers
Chinese sabre fencers
Wheelchair fencers at the 2016 Summer Paralympics
Wheelchair fencers at the 2020 Summer Paralympics
Medalists at the 2016 Summer Paralympics
Medalists at the 2020 Summer Paralympics
Paralympic gold medalists for China
Paralympic silver medalists for China
Paralympic medalists in wheelchair fencing
Paralympic wheelchair fencers of China
21st-century Chinese women